Tobias Stranover or Toby Stranovius (1684–1756) was a Transylvanian Saxon born painter (1684–after 1731).

Stranover was born in Hermannstadt but travelled to Germany, the Netherlands, and England, where he stayed. He is registered in Hamburg, Hermannstadt, Amsterdam and London. He became a follower of the bird painter Melchior d'Hondecoeter and presumably also Jakob Bogdány, whose daughter Elisabeth he married.

Stranover died in London.

References

 

1684 births
1756 deaths
People from Sibiu
18th-century German painters
18th-century German male artists